The silver oriole (Oriolus mellianus) is a species of bird in the family Oriolidae. It breeds in southern China and winters in mainland Southeast Asia.

Its natural habitats are subtropical or tropical moist lowland forest and subtropical or tropical moist montane forest where it is threatened by habitat loss.

Taxonomy and systematics 
The silver oriole was originally described as a subspecies of the maroon oriole.  Along with the black, black-and-crimson and maroon orioles, it belongs to a clade of red and black orioles. Alternate names for the silver oriole include Mell's maroon oriole, Mell's oriole, Stresemann's maroon oriole and Stresemann's oriole.

References 

silver oriole
Birds of South China
silver oriole
Taxonomy articles created by Polbot